Chen Chin-san (born 18 January 1959) is a Taiwanese bobsledder. He competed at the 1984, 1988, 1992 and the 2002 Winter Olympics.

References

External links
 

1959 births
Living people
Taiwanese male bobsledders
Olympic bobsledders of Taiwan
Bobsledders at the 1984 Winter Olympics
Bobsledders at the 1988 Winter Olympics
Bobsledders at the 1992 Winter Olympics
Bobsledders at the 2002 Winter Olympics
People from Hualien County
20th-century Taiwanese people
21st-century Taiwanese people